Michio Mamiya (born June 29, 1929) is a Japanese composer.

Born in Hokkaido, he studied at the Tokyo University of the Arts. His interest in Japanese folk music led him to compose several choral works incorporating traditional elements. He is particularly noted for his opera: his Narukami (1974) "won a grand prix at the Salzburg Opera Festival".

References

External links
Composer profile

1929 births
Concert band composers
Japanese opera composers
Living people
Male opera composers
Musicians from Hokkaido
Tokyo University of the Arts alumni